The Tübingen triangle is, apart from the Penrose rhomb tilings and their variations, a classical candidate to model 5-fold (respectively 10-fold) quasicrystals. The inflation factor is – as in the Penrose case – the golden mean, 

The prototiles are Robinson triangles, but the relation is different: The Penrose rhomb tilings are locally derivable from the Tübingen triangle tilings.

These tilings were discovered and studied thoroughly by a group in Tübingen, Germany, thus the name.

Since the prototiles are mirror symmetric, but their substitutions are not, left-handed and right-handed tiles need to be distinguished. This is indicated by the colours in the substitution rule and in the patches of the relevant figures.

See also
 Mathematics and art

References 

Aperiodic tilings